Siamusotima aranea is a species of moth of the family Crambidae first described by Maria Alma Solis et al. in 2005.

References

Musotiminae
Moths described in 2005